Captain John Quilliam RN; MHK (Marown, Isle of Man 29 September 1771 – Kirk Michael, Isle of Man 10 October 1829) was a Royal Navy officer who served as first lieutenant on HMS Victory at the Battle of Trafalgar. He was a farmer's son who was impressed into the Royal Navy in 1791.

Biography

Early life
The eldest son of John Quilliam and Christian Clucas of Ballakelly, John Quilliam was born in Marown, Isle of Man, in 1771. It is said he did not care for farming and consequently he was apprenticed to a stonemason. However, he was impressed into the Royal Navy from a collier in Castletown harbour.

Career
Unlike most impressed sailors, Quilliam rose rapidly in the Royal Navy. By 1797 he had risen to the rank of midshipman and is recorded at the Battle of Camperdown following which he was again promoted, this time to the rank of lieutenant, on the recommendation of Admiral Duncan subsequently serving as third lieutenant on the frigate , under the command of Captain James Young.

On 7 October 1799 Ethalion captured the 36-gun Spanish treasure ship Thetis. For his part in the capture, Quilliam received over £5000.

Battle of Copenhagen
At the Battle of Copenhagen in 1801, Quilliam was first lieutenant aboard the frigate . The slight draft of the Amazon meant she was able to get close under the shore batteries; however this in turn led to the Amazon receiving a high volume of damage, the result of which was that all the higher-ranking officers were killed, leaving Quilliam in command. Quilliam's gallantry and calmness under fire following the death of Captain Edward Riou and all the senior officers of the Amazon, quickly came to the attention of Lord Nelson who appointed him first lieutenant on HMS Victory when she was commissioned as Nelson's flagship a period during which he was to become an accomplished officer.

Battle of Trafalgar
Quilliam was the senior lieutenant on the Victory being responsible for safety, part of this remit seeing him develop an emergency system in order to steer the ship. He assisted in steering Victory into action at Trafalgar, his system coming into effect early in the battle, when having sustained damage to her steering gear Victory required all Quilliam's experience in order for her to continue to remain seaworthy.

A contemporary report stated:

Post Trafalgar
Following Trafalgar Quilliam was promoted to captain and placed in command of HMS Ildefonso, a Spanish 74 having to refit her at Gibraltar and not arriving in England until 16 May 1806. In 1808, he was captain of Admiral Stopford's flagship HMS Spencer, subsequently taking command of the frigates HMS Alexandria, HMS Inconstant and HMS Crescent, seeing action on the Newfoundland Station where he served as such until the defeat of Napoleon in 1815 when he retired from the navy.

On 18 September 1813, off Cape Row as captain of the Crescent, Quilliam captured the 14-gun American privateer schooner the Elbridge Gerry together with her crew of 66 men.

Personal life

Politics
Although still an active naval officer, in 1807 Capt. Quilliam was invited to become a Member of the House of Keys. At that time the body was self-elected, the members being chosen by the lieutenant governor on the recommendation of the house. He resigned his seat in 1810 in order to return to sea, however on his return to the Island he was again invited to continue as a Member of the House of Keys in 1817.

Retirement
On the conclusion of his career in the navy, Captain Quilliam returned to the Isle of Man, investing his considerable wealth in numerous properties. On 21 December 1807, Quilliam married Margaret Stevenson at Castletown, his wife being part of a renowned Manx family from Balladoole. The couple made their family home at Ballakeighan before they acquired a property on the Parade, Castletown, living in the house known as the "Balcony House." The marriage produced no children.

Quilliam's main hobby was fishing, and he occupied himself with a small fishing boat which he designed and fitted out himself.

In 1826 Capt. Quilliam was instrumental along with Sir William Hillary in the formation on the Isle of Man of a District Association of the Royal National Institution of the Preservation of Life from Shipwreck. He also served as Chairman of the Committee for Shipwrecked Seamen. In addition he was one of a group of gentlemen who put forward the scheme for the erection of the Derbyhaven Breakwater.

Death
Capt. Qulliam died on 10 October 1829. He was buried in the Stevenson family vault in the graveyard at Kirk Arbory.

Memorial

There is the following inscription on his tombstone;

HMS Quilliam

HMS Quilliam was a Q-class destroyer serving in the Royal Navy from 1942 to 1945. She was then transferred to the Royal Netherlands Navy, where she was commissioned as Hr.Ms. Banckert (D801) until 1957. During her wartime service Quilliam was involved in operations in both the Atlantic and Pacific Oceans. While taking part in Operation Iceberg (the Invasion of Okinawa), Quilliam was involved in a collision with the British aircraft carrier .

Commemoration

 A sculpture of Quilliam by Manx artist Bryan Kneale was unveiled on Trafalgar Day 2005 at Castle Rushen. The sculpture won the 2007 Marsh Award for Excellence in Public Sculpture.
 The uniform of Captain Quilliam is on public display at the Manx Museum, Douglas, Isle of Man.
 To mark the 150th anniversary of his death in 1979, a series of postage stamps by the Isle of Man Post Office dedicated to Capt. Quilliam were released. The four stamps in the series depicted Quilliam being impressed into the Royal Navy, his role at the Battle of Trafalgar, his time in command of HMS Spencer and his subsequent career as a Member of the House of Keys.

References

External links

1771 births
1829 deaths
Manx people
Royal Navy personnel of the French Revolutionary Wars
Royal Navy officers
British naval commanders of the Napoleonic Wars
Members of the House of Keys